is a Japanese actor and voice actor from Tōkyō Metropolis attached to the Bungaku Company.

Filmography

Television drama
Ai Yori Aoku (1972) (Shūtarō Murakami)
Kusa Moeru (1979) (Soga Tokimune)
Special Rescue Exceedraft (1992) (Tadao Jinno)
Atsuhime (2008) (Camera operator)

Film
Portrait of Brothers (2019)
Leaving the Scene (2019)

Television animation
Monster (2004) (Doctor Becker)
Golgo 13 (????) (Jimmy)
Rurōni Kenshin: Meiji Kenkaku Romantan (????) (Anji Yūkyūzan)

Video games
Age of Empires III (????) (The Infante Henrique)

Dubbing roles

Live action
Billy Bob Thornton
Bandits (Terry Collins)
The Man Who Wasn't There (Ed Crane)
Intolerable Cruelty (Howard D. Doyle)
Bad News Bears (Morris Buttermaker)
Eagle Eye (Tom Morgan)
Faster (Detective Slade Humphries)
Whiskey Tango Foxtrot (Brigadier General Hollanek)
The Gray Man (Donald Fitzroy)
Dennis Quaid
The Day After Tomorrow (Professor Jack Hall)
In Good Company (Dan Foreman)
Vantage Point (Agent Thomas Barnes)
G.I. Joe: The Rise of Cobra (General Hawk)
Truth (Colonel Roger Charles)
Kurt Russell
Unlawful Entry (1997 TV Asahi edition) (Michael Carr)
Executive Decision (1999 TV Asahi edition) (Dr. David Grant)
Breakdown (1999 NTV edition) (Jeff Taylor)
Miracle (Herb Brooks)
Ralph Fiennes
Skyfall (Gareth Mallory / M)
Spectre (Gareth Mallory / M)
No Time to Die (Gareth Mallory / M)
The 4400 (Tom Baldwin (Joel Gretsch))
Asteroid (Jack Wallach (Michael Biehn))
Before Night Falls (Reinaldo Arenas (Javier Bardem))
Beverly Hills Cop III (Detective Billy Rosewood (Judge Reinhold))
Big Game (Vice President of the United States (Victor Garber))
Blue Thunder (2004 DVD edition) (Francis McNeil "Frank" Murphy (Roy Scheider))
Bunraku (The Bartender (Woody Harrelson))
Can You Ever Forgive Me? (Jack Hock (Richard E. Grant))
Criminal Minds: Suspect Behavior (Jonathan "Prophet" Sims (Michael Kelly))
The Da Vinci Code (Bishop Manuel Aringarosa (Alfred Molina))
Dark Blue World (František "Franta" Sláma (Ondřej Vetchý))
Demon Knight (The Collector (Billy Zane))
Don't Look Up (Peter Isherwell (Mark Rylance))
Dunkirk (Mr. Dawson (Mark Rylance))
El tiempo entre costuras (Juan Luis Beigbeder (Tristán Ulloa))
Feud (Jack L. Warner (Stanley Tucci))
Freaky Friday (Ryan (Mark Harmon))
From the Earth to the Moon (Wally Schirra (Mark Harmon))
The General's Daughter (Colonel Bob Moore (James Woods))
Godzilla (Joe Brody (Bryan Cranston))
Gone with the Wind (1998 DVD edition) (Ashley Wilkes (Leslie Howard))
Greta (Chris McCullen (Colm Feore))
Home Alone 3 (Petr Beaupre (Aleksander Krupa))
Home Alone 4: Taking Back the House (Peter McCallister (Jason Beghe))
Idlewild (Percival Jenkins (André 3000))
Inside Men (Lee Kang-hee (Baek Yoon-sik))
The Legend (Gogugyang of Goguryeo (Dokgo Young-jae))
The Legend of Zorro (Jacob McGivens (Nick Chinlund))
Life Is Beautiful (Guido Orefice (Roberto Benigni))
Love Actually (Daniel (Liam Neeson))
The Lover (The Chinaman (Tony Leung Chiu-wai))
MacGyver (Murdock (Michael Des Barres))
The Mothman Prophecies (John Klein (Richard Gere))
The Mountain Between Us (Mark Robertson (Dermot Mulroney))
Mulan (Hua Zhou (Tzi Ma))
Nomadland (Dave (David Strathairn))
Patch Adams (Doctor Hunter "Patch" Adams (Robin Williams))
The Pelican Brief (Gray Grantham (Denzel Washington))
Pixels (Toru Iwatani (Denis Akiyama))
Poltergeist (1996 TV Asahi edition) (Steve Freeling (Craig T. Nelson))
Remember the Titans (Bill Yoast (Will Patton))
Resident Evil: Extinction (2010 TV Asahi edition) (Chase (Linden Ashby))
Roswell (Daniel Pierce (David Conrad))
Self/less (Old Damian Hale (Ben Kingsley))
Sherlock (D.I. Lestrade (Rupert Graves))
Simon Birch (Reverend Russell (David Strathairn))
Spy Game (2005 TV Tokyo edition) (Charles Harker (Stephen Dillane))
Thirteen Days (Kenneth O'Donnell (Kevin Costner))
Those Who Kill (Leif Halborg (Henrik Prip))
Three Christs (Dr. Alan Stone (Richard Gere))
Transformers (Tom Banachek (Michael O'Neill))
Transformers: Revenge of the Fallen (General Morshower (Glenn Morshower))
Transformers: Dark of the Moon (General Morshower (Glenn Morshower))
Twin Peaks (1990–91) (Agent Dale Cooper (Kyle MacLachlan))
Twin Peaks: Fire Walk with Me (Agent Dale Cooper (Kyle MacLachlan))
Twin Peaks (2017) (Agent Dale Cooper (Kyle MacLachlan))
Twister (Dr. Jonas Miller (Cary Elwes))
U-571 (2003 TV Asahi edition) (Lieutenant Hirsch (Jake Weber))
The Village (Edward Walker (William Hurt))
Virtuosity (Lt. Parker Barnes (Denzel Washington))
A Walk on the Moon (Marty Kantrowitz (Liev Schreiber))
Wanted (Cross (Thomas Kretschmann))
War (Chang (John Lone))
While You Were Sleeping (Peter Callaghan (Peter Gallagher))
X2 (President McKenna (Cotter Smith))
Yellowstone (John Dutton (Kevin Costner))
The Young Pope (Cardinal Angelo Voiello (Silvio Orlando))

Animation
Batman: The Animated Series (Kaiser)
Curious George (The Man with the Yellow Hat)

References

External links
 

1952 births
Japanese male voice actors
Living people
People from Tokyo